Jimmy Connors was the defending champion but lost in the second round to Hank Pfister.
Sixth-seeded Harold Solomon claimed the title after Corrado Barazzutti retired from the final due to food poisoning.

Seeds

  Jimmy Connors (second round)
  Brian Gottfried (quarterfinals)
  Raúl Ramírez (semifinals)
  Corrado Barazzutti (final)
  Roscoe Tanner (quarterfinals)
  Harold Solomon (champion)
  Ilie Năstase (first round)
  John McEnroe (second round)

Draw

Finals

Top half

Bottom half

References
General

Specific

1978 Alan King Tennis Classic